The Tamil Nadu State Chess Association (TNSCA) is the apex body for the game of chess in Tamil Nadu, India. It was formed on 26 April 1947 with a view to identifying upcoming chess players and mould them into world-class professionals.  The association was earlier known as Madras Chess Club. It is affiliated with the All India Chess Federation.

Affiliates
The TNSCA has a number of affiliated district associations, academies and special units under it.

District associations
Chennai District Chess Association Refer http://tamilchess.com/distric-associations/
Life Member District Chess Association
Chengalpattu District Chess Association
Coimbatore District Chess Association
Cuddalore District Chess Association
Dharmapuri District Chess Association
Dindigul District Chess Association
Erode District - Ad Hoc Committee
Kanchipuram District Chess Association
Kanyakumari District Chess Association
Karur District Chess Association
Krishnagiri District Chess Association
Madurai District Chess Association
Namakkal District Chess Foundation
Nilgiris District Chess Association
Pudukkottai District Chess Association
Salem District Chess Association
Sivagangai District Chess Association
Thanjavur District Chess Association
Thoothukudi District Chess Association
Trichy District Chess Association
Tirunelveli District Chess Association
Tirupur District Chess Association
Thiruvallur District Chess Association
Tiruvannamalai District Chess Association
Tiruvarur District Chess Association
CHennai
Vellore District Chess Association Ad Hoc Committee
Villupuram District Chess Association
Virudhunagar District Chess Association

Academies
Cape Chess Academy Nagercoil
Aaron Chess Academy
champion Chess Academy Tiruvannamalai
Anna Nagar Chess Academy
Chess Gurukul
Chromepet Chess Institute
King Chess Foundation
Purasai Chess Academy
Shakthi Chess Academy
Solar Chess Club
Stars Chess Academy Nagercoil 
T. Nagar Chess Academy
Taanyakhavya School of Sports
Vaishnavi Friends Club
Mount Chess Academy
Universal Sports Academy
Meenakshi Chess Centre
Nova Chess Academy
The Elite Club of Chess
Utilityforum of Chess
Castle Chess Academy
Chola Chess Academy
Bloom Chess Academy
Vishy Anand Chess Academy
Thiruthuraipoondi Chess Club
Vaelai Chess Academy
Thirumangalam Kidscare Chess Academy
sai chess academy, erode
Villupuram Chess Academy, Villupuram

Special units
ESI Corporation Regional Office (TN)
ICF Sports Association
Indian Bank Sports Central Sports Committee
Nanjil Chess Club
Southern Railway Sports Association
Sports Promotion Foundation
St. Johns International Residential School
T.N.E.B. Sports Control Board
SRM University
St Joseph's College Of Engineering

Events
1. The association has been organizing a number of chess events. 
2. Chess tournament details can also be found in easypaychess. 
2. Chess tournament details can also be found in https://www.chessfee.com/.

References

External links
Official Website of TNSCA

Chess organizations
Chess in India
Sports organizations established in 1947
Sport in Tamil Nadu
1947 establishments in India